Ayanda Dube; (born November 13, 1989) is a Swazi model and beauty pageant titleholder who was crowned Miss Swaziland 2011 and represented her country in the 2012 Miss Universe pageants.

Early life
Ayanda attended the University of Eswatini (UNISWA) Luyengo campus.

Miss Swaziland 2011/2012
Ayanda Dube was crowned Miss Swaziland 2011 on Friday night 21 October 2011 at the Woodlands Hall at Ezulwini, during a contest that saw 13 beauty contestants competing for the title.

References

1989 births
Living people
Swazi beauty pageant winners